Golgin-45 is a protein that in humans is encoded by the BLZF1 gene.

Interactions 

BLZF1 has been shown to interact with GORASP2.

References

Further reading

External links 
 
 

Transcription factors